Jean Gerard may refer to:
 Jean Broward Shevlin Gerard, American ambassador
 Jean Sebastien Gerard, musician